St. Leonards railway station is a closed railway station in St Leonard's, Edinburgh, on the Edinburgh and Dalkeith Railway. It was Edinburgh's first railway station. The railway was built in 1831 to transport coal from the mining towns south of the city; and the following year opened passenger services. St. Leonards was the terminus for the south of the city and was named after the nearby region.

Passenger services ceased in 1846, when the North British Railway opened a station at North Bridge which later developed into Waverley station. Services from Dalkeith were re-routed via Portobello.  The station reopened briefly between 1 June 1860 and 30 September 1860 when a service was temporarily re-introduced from St. Leonard's to Dalkeith, Portobello and Leith, but it closed again within a few months. The railhead continued to see heavy use in its original intended role as a coal yard until 1968.

Both the coal depot and part of the railway line have been redeveloped as housing. The goods shed is the only surviving building; it has been  designated a Category B listed building by Historic Environment Scotland. Since 2019, it has been used as a whisky and gin distillery with an accompanying visitor centre. The remaining trackbed is now a footpath and cycle path, forming part of the National Cycle Network Route 1.

See also
 Innocent Railway

References

External links
 Railways - St Leonard's Station

Disused railway stations in Edinburgh
Former North British Railway stations
Listed railway stations in Scotland
Category B listed buildings in Edinburgh
Railway stations in Great Britain opened in 1832
Railway stations in Great Britain closed in 1846
Railway stations in Great Britain opened in 1860
Railway stations in Great Britain closed in 1860
Railway stations in Great Britain closed in 1968